Panicoideae is the second-largest subfamily of the grasses with over 3,500 species, mainly distributed in warm temperate and tropical regions. It comprises some important agricultural crops, including sugarcane, maize (or corn), sorghum, and switchgrass.

C4 photosynthesis evolved independently a number of times in the subfamily, which presumably had a C3 ancestor.

Description 
The ligule has a fringe of hairs. The inflorescence is branched around a common axis. The spikelets are all alike with two bisexual florets that are joined below the glumes (the outer floral envelopes). The lower glume is shorter than the spikelet.

Systematics and taxonomy
Within the PACMAD clade of grasses, the Panicoideae are sister to a clade made of the four subfamilies Arundinoideae, Chloridoideae, Danthonioideae, and Micrairoideae. A modern phylogenetic classification divides the Panicoideae in twelve tribes corresponding to monophyletic clades; two genera, Chandrasekharania and Jansenella, are unplaced (incertae sedis) but probably belong to tribe Tristachyideae. The three largest tribes, Paniceae, Paspaleae, and Andropogoneae, together with the small Arundinelleae, form the core of the subfamily. The Gynerieae were formerly placed in Arundinoideae, and the basal lineage, the "centothecoid clade" with seven tribes, was formerly seen as separate subfamily, Centothecoideae.

Phylogeny based on chloroplast DNA analyses, showing relationships of tribes within the subfamily (dashed lines indicate uncertain positions; C4 clades flagged):

Gallery

References

 
Poaceae subfamilies